Mike Maneluk (born October 1, 1973) is a Canadian former professional ice hockey left winger.

Playing career
Maneluk played three seasons for the Brandon Wheat Kings of the Western Hockey League and one for the Canadian National Team before becoming a professional. He averaged nearly a point per game in the American Hockey League with the Baltimore Bandits, Worcester IceCats, and Philadelphia Phantoms over the course of his career. Maneluk won the Jack A. Butterfield Trophy as MVP of the 1998 Calder Cup Playoffs, and led the league in scoring in the 1999–2000 season.

He went to Switzerland for the 2001–02 season, playing with HC Lugano in the Swiss National League for four seasons. He then joined EV Zug, and played several seasons with the team. He played for EHC Basel in 2006-2007 and HC Davos in the 2007–08 season. After a stint with HC Dinamo Minsk of the Kontinental Hockey League, he finished his career in the Swiss B-League.

Maneluk played for Team Canada in the Spengler Cup (Davos) on 5 occasions as well as in the Men's World Championships. In 85 career NHL games, Maneluk scored eleven goals and added ten assists.

He retired from ice hockey in 2009 and he left Switzerland and returned to Canada. He now resides in Winnipeg, Manitoba.

Career statistics

Regular season and playoffs

International

External links
 

1973 births
Living people
Baltimore Bandits players
Brandon Wheat Kings players
Canadian ice hockey left wingers
Chicago Blackhawks players
Chicago Wolves (IHL) players
Columbus Blue Jackets players
EHC Basel players
EV Zug players
HC Ambrì-Piotta players
HC Davos players
HC Dinamo Minsk players
HC Lugano players
Lausanne HC players
Ice hockey people from Winnipeg
New York Rangers players
Philadelphia Flyers players
Philadelphia Phantoms players
San Diego Gulls (IHL) players
SC Langenthal players
St. Boniface Saints (ice hockey) players
Undrafted National Hockey League players
Worcester IceCats players
Canadian expatriate ice hockey players in Belarus
Canadian expatriate ice hockey players in Switzerland